Finzan / A Dance for Heroes is a 1989 Malian film, the second feature film directed by Cheick Oumar Sissoko. The Malian film critic Manthia Diawara welcomed the film, which deals with arranged marriage and female genital mutilation, as "an impassioned cry for the emancipation of African women [...] one of the boldest examples of socially engaged filmmaking to come out of Africa in recent years".

The film opens with a shot of a mother goat nursing her kids, before cutting to a page of statistics from the World Conference on Women, 1980:

The main character in Finzan is a widow, Nanyuma, expected by tradition to marry her brother-in-law, Bala. To avoid doing do, she escapes to the city, but is eventually captured, tied up, and sent back. Though forced to undergo the marriage ceremony, she refuses to consummate it, and eventually leaves the village to make her own future. In a subplot, a well-educated young women, Fili, questions female genital mutilation. In one of the film's final scenes, she Fili is captured by a group of women and forcibly excised.

References

External links
 
 Finzan at African Film Festival, Inc.

1989 films
Malian drama films